The Lockport Powerhouse is a run-of-the-river dam used by the Metropolitan Water Reclamation District of Greater Chicago to control the outflow of the Sanitary and Ship Canal and limit the diversion of water from Lake Michigan into the Des Plaines River.

History
The Chicago Sanitary and Ship Canal reached Lockport, Illinois in the 1890s. As part of this construction, a lock and dam was built in Lockport. Seven waste gates, used to control the level of water in the canal and Des Plaines River, were part of this project. From 1903 to 1907, the canal was extended from Lockport to Joliet. Construction on the Lockport Powerhouse began as part of this extension in 1905. Designed by Frederick L. Barrett, the red-roofed Beaux Arts powerhouse was constructed with concrete blocks coursed to resemble stone. The powerhouse featured four Francis-style turbines to generate electrical power, capable of generating . These turbines have since been replaced with two vertical Kaplan turbines. The powerhouse was also the home of the waste gate controls. The lock and gates were designed to manage a  drop in canal elevation between the two municipalities.

A second phase of construction occurred from 1922 to 1933 to handle differing water loads following the opening of the Ohio River Standard Navigation Lock. First operational in 1907, the powerhouse is now recognized as the oldest hydroelectric plant in Illinois. The Lockport Lock, Dam and Power House Historic District was recognized by the National Park Service with a listing on the National Register of Historic Places on March 10, 2004.

Navigation Lock
The lock next to the dam & powerhouse is largely used for barge traffic and has a 39 foot (11.8 meters) drop. It is the second of eight locks on the Illinois Waterway connecting Lake Michigan to the Mississippi River.

References

External links 

 Lockport Powerhouse
 I&M Canal Photo History
 Inventory of Nonutility Electric Power Plants in the United States 2000 (PDF)
 National Register of Historic Places (Will County, Illinois)

Buildings and structures in Will County, Illinois
Dams in Illinois
Hydroelectric power plants in Illinois
Lockport, Illinois
Dams completed in 1907
Dams on the National Register of Historic Places in Illinois
Energy infrastructure completed in 1907
Energy infrastructure on the National Register of Historic Places
Locks on the National Register of Historic Places in Illinois
Historic districts on the National Register of Historic Places in Illinois
National Register of Historic Places in Will County, Illinois